Brady Wiseman was a Democratic Party member of the Montana House of Representatives, representing District 65.

He led the House in opposition to the USA PATRIOT Act as invasive of privacy and a threat to civil liberties, and has fought the REAL ID Act on similar grounds.

References

External links
Montana House of Representatives - Brady Wiseman official MT State Legislature website
Vote Smart - Representative Brady Wiseman (MT) profile

1957 births
Living people
University of Montana alumni
Members of the Montana House of Representatives